Nuevo París is a barrio (neighbourhood) of Montevideo, Uruguay.

See also 
Barrios of Montevideo

External links 
 Intendencia de Montevideo / Historia / Barrios / (see section) Nuevo París, Belvedere y 19 de Abril

Barrios of Montevideo